Suwon Dasan Middle School is a public middle school founded in 2013, located in Suwon, Gyeonggi Province.
It currently has 885 students with 62 school personnel (as of March 1, 2015).

History
The school was established March 1, 2013 with inauguration of its first president, Jeong Eui Ho.

Its first graduation ceremony, with 110 graduates, was held February 12, 2014.
Entrance ceremony with 258 students was held March 3, 2014.
The second graduation ceremony, with 185 graduates, was held February 10, 2015; followed by an entrance ceremony for 314 students on March 2, 2015.

References

External links

2013 establishments in South Korea
Educational institutions established in 2013
Middle schools in South Korea
Schools in Suwon